Dryden is an unincorporated community in south central Terrell County, Texas, United States.

History
The community was founded in 1882 and named for Eugene E. Dryden, the chief engineer of the Galveston, Harrisburg and San Antonio Railway, which was building its tracks through Terrell County and established a section house at Dryden. Over the next several decades Dryden became a small center for ranching-based businesses. The headquarters for the Pecos Land and Cattle Company was established in Dryden in 1884.  The company drilled a well that supplied the area with water.

By 1912, a hotel, the Dryden Hotel, had been established, along with a combined schoolhouse, community center, and church.  Dryden had a population of nearly 100 by 1929.

Two units of U.S. Army troops were stationed in Dryden during the 1913–17 Mexican border unrest. During the Great Depression of the 1930s, the railway moved its crews and closed its depot at Dryden, and the area’s ranches were eventually broken up. Population began to dwindle to approximately fifty by 1970. Although a general store was operating in 1995, the population continued to decline to thirteen by 1988.

The post office dates from 1888. The United States Postal Service currently maintains a post office in Dryden.

Wayne Sutton has been appointed mayor by the other residents.

Geography
Dryden is located on U.S. Route 90 at the intersection with State Highway 349, 100 miles (162 km) west of Del Rio.

Climate
Elevation: .

See also
List of ghost towns in Texas

References

Unincorporated communities in Texas
Unincorporated communities in Terrell County, Texas
Ghost towns in West Texas